María de la Cruz Nájera Botello (known as Maricruz Nájera) is a Mexican actress. She is the wife of Alejandro Bichir, and the mother of Odiseo, Demián and Bruno Bichir.

Filmography

Telenovelas 
 A que no me dejas (2015) .... Silvia
 Un Refugio para el Amor (2012) .... Matilde
 Rafaela (2011) .... Constanza
 Triunfo del amor (2010–2011) .... Tomasa Hernández
 Para volver a amar (2010–2011) ....  Doña Confesión vda. de Bravo
 Las Vías del Amor (2002) .... Laura Albavera
 Amigas y rivales (2001) .... Camelia
 La usurpadora (1998) .... Emiliana
 Desencuentro (1997) .... Rosario
 Mi querida Isabel (1996) .... Jesusita
 Caminos cruzados (1994) .... Elsa
 Valentina (1993) .... Gloria Luque
 El abuelo y yo (1992) .... Madre Adoración
 María Mercedes (1992) .... Nana Cruz
 Madres egoístas (1991) .... Natalia Blinder
 Yo compro esa mujer (1990) .... Juliana
 Mi pequeña Soledad (1990)
 Cuna de lobos (1986) .... vda. de Gutiérrez
 La fiera (1983) .... Angelina
 Por amor (1982) .... Julia
 Déjame vivir (1982) .... Josefina
 Los ricos también lloran (1979) .... María #2
 Viviana (1978) .... Nurse
 Mamá Campanita (1978) .... Martina
 Rina (1977) .... Nurse

Television series 
 Los simuladores (2010) .... Tomasa
 Central de abasto (2009)
 Sexo y otros secretos (2007) .... Doña Cándida
 Mujer, casos de la vida real (1989) .... Paulina (Episode: "Suplantación")

Films 
 Men with Guns (1997) .... Mujer rica
 La güera Chabela (1994)
 Amor a la medida (1993)
 El patrullero (1991) .... Sra. Rojas
 La gata Cristy (1990) .... Clotilde
 De la cabeza al cielo (1990)
 El patrullero 777 (1978)
 Canoa (1976)
 La muerte de Pancho Villa (1974)
 El principio (1973)
 Los días del amor (1972) .... Isaura
 Para servir a usted (1971)
 El quelite (1970)
 Emiliano Zapata (1970)
 El juego de Zuzanka (1970)

References

External links

Living people
Mexican telenovela actresses
Mexican television actresses
Mexican film actresses
20th-century Mexican actresses
21st-century Mexican actresses
Actresses from Mexico City
People from Mexico City
Year of birth missing (living people)